Marcel Vonlanden (born 8 September 1933) is a Swiss football forward who played for Switzerland in the 1962 FIFA World Cup. He also played for FC Lausanne-Sport.

References

1933 births
Swiss men's footballers
Switzerland international footballers
Association football forwards
FC Lausanne-Sport players
1962 FIFA World Cup players
Living people
Sportspeople from Lausanne